Percival James Hector Jory (21 December 1888 – 19 September 1964) was an Australian rules footballer who played with St Kilda in the Victorian Football League (VFL).

Family
The son of John Jory (1855–1897), and Alice Jory (1856–1922), née Pearce, Percival James Hector Jory was born at Creswick, Victoria on 21 December 1888.

His nephew, Edward Ronald "Ron" Jory (1925–2013) played for Essendon in the VFL, and for Oakleigh in the VFA.

Football
Recruited from the North Hobart Football Club in the Tasmanian Football League.

His permit to play for St Kilda was granted on 24 April 1912, and he soon established himself as a forward who could also play in the ruck. He was a half-forward flanker in the 1913 VFL Grand Final loss to Fitzroy and two seasons later got suspended for 12 matches after being found guilty of elbowing an opponent.

When he returned home from his service with the First AIF he rejoined St Kilda briefly and then began umpiring matches in the country. He umpired three VFL games as a field umpire in 1925.

Jory umpired the 1927 Ovens and Murray Football League grand final.

From 1934 to 1942 he made 123 appearances as a goal umpire.

Military service
He enlisted in the First AIF on 12 January 1916, served overseas with the 31st Field Artillery Battery of the 8th Field Artillery Brigade, leaving Australia on the HMAT Medic on 20 May 1916, and returned to Australia on the H.T. Windhuk, arriving at Melbourne on 18 August 1919.

28 October 1916
While overseas, he played for the Third Australian Divisional Team, captained by South Melbourne's Bruce Sloss, in the famous "Pioneer Exhibition Game" of Australian Rules football, held in London, in October 1916, against the Australian Training Units Team, captained by Norwood's Charlie Perry. A news film was taken at the match.

See also
 1916 Pioneer Exhibition Game

Footnotes

References
 Pioneer Exhibition Game Australian Football: in aid of British and French Red Cross Societies: 3rd Australian Division v. Australian Training Units at Queen's Club, West Kensington, on Saturday, October 28th, 1916, at 3pm, Wightman & Co., (London), 1919.
 Football Champion: Private Percy Jory, The Winner, (Wednesday, 1 November 1916), p.8.
 Holmesby, Russell and Main, Jim (2007). The Encyclopedia of AFL Footballers. 7th ed. Melbourne: Bas Publishing.
 World War One Embarkation Roll: Gunner Sergeant Percival James Hector Jory (19992), collection of the Australian War Memorial.
 World War One Nominal Roll: Quartermaster Sergeant Percival James Jory (19992), collection of the Australian War Memorial.
 World War One Service Record: Quartermaster Sergeant Percival James Hector Jory (19992), National Archives of Australia.
 Third player from left in back row in the team photograph at Tasmania (team photograph), The (Adelaide) Chronicle, (Saturday, 12 August 1911), p.31.
 The St. Kilda Football Team (Photograph), The Leader, (Saturday, 15 June 1912), p.30.

External links
 
 

1888 births
1964 deaths
Australian rules footballers from Tasmania
Australian Rules footballers: place kick exponents
North Hobart Football Club players
St Kilda Football Club players
Participants in "Pioneer Exhibition Game" (London, 28 October 1916)
Australian Football League umpires
People from Creswick, Victoria
Australian military personnel of World War I
Australian rules footballers from Victoria (Australia)